Allison is an unincorporated community in Stone County, Arkansas, United States. The Sylamore Creek Bridge, which is listed on the National Register of Historic Places, is located in Allison.

References

Unincorporated communities in Stone County, Arkansas
Unincorporated communities in Arkansas